Cottager or Cottagers may refer to:

 The Cottagers, opera by George Saville Carey
 Chalupáři, Czech comedy
 The Cottagers, nickname for Fulham F.C., a football club in London
 Cottagers, one of the levels of serfdom in feudal societies

See also
 Cottage (disambiguation)